Pipe Creek Township, Indiana may refer to one of the following places:

Pipe Creek Township, Madison County, Indiana
Pipe Creek Township, Miami County, Indiana

See also 

Pipe Creek (disambiguation)

Indiana township disambiguation pages